Inih Othneil Effiong (born 2 March 1991) is an English professional footballer who currently plays as a forward for Dagenham & Redbridge.

Club career
Effiong was born in England and is of Nigerian descent. He started his career with St Albans City and made his debut in 2008, he went onto enjoy spells with Northwood and Boreham Wood before returning to City, two years later. Effiong went onto register fourteen goals in the 2013–14 campaign in forty-one appearances, this impressive form brought the attention of his former club, Boreham Wood. Unable to agree a fee, the deal went to a tribunal and Effiong returned to the Wood. After failing to adapt to life at Boreham Wood, Effiong had loan spells with Hitchin Town and Chesham United, where he flourished, especially at Chesham, netting seven times in seven games. He went onto to return to Boreham Wood, before making a permanent move back to Chesham. Following his two years with Chesham, Effiong went onto have spells at Dunstable Town, Burnham and Arlesey Town before joining Biggleswade Town in July 2015. Preceding a successful first season with the Waders, Effiong went onto net 23 times in the following campaign. This impressive form brought the attention of many Football League and National League sides.

On 27 January 2017, Effiong joined National League side, Barrow on a deal until the end of the campaign. On 18 February 2017, he made his debut for Barrow during their 0–0 home draw with Torquay United, replacing Richie Bennett in the 84th minute. A month later, Effiong scored his first and only goal for Barrow in their 2–1 home victory over Tranmere Rovers, netting the Bluebirds' equaliser in the 63rd minute. On 10 May 2017, it was announced that Effiong would leave Barrow upon the expiry of his contract in June.

Two weeks later, Effiong joined fellow National League side Woking on a one-year deal. On the opening day of the 2017–18 campaign, Effiong netted eighteen minutes into his Woking debut, during their 2–1 home victory over Gateshead. During Woking's impressive FA Cup run, Effiong netted twice in six appearances, including goals against League One sides Bury and Peterborough United. In the space of six months, Effiong registered ten goals in all competitions, his last coming in a 4–4 draw with Maidstone United, before leaving in January 2018.

On 19 January 2018, Effiong joined Scottish Premiership side Ross County on a one-and-half-year deal for an undisclosed fee. A day later, he made his debut for Ross County during their 1–0 away defeat to Kilmarnock in the Scottish Cup, featuring for 86 minutes before being replaced by Alex Schalk. Effiong left the club on 6 April 2018.

On 23 June 2018, Effiong signed for National League club Dover Athletic.

After two prolific seasons at Dover, Effiong joined Stevenage on 23 June 2020. He scored his first goal for Stevenage in a 1-1 draw against Barrow on 12 September 2020. Effiong joined Barnet on a one month loan on 2 December 2020. On 11 January 2021, Effiong joined National League side Notts County on loan for the remainder of the 2020-21 season. Unfortunately, his loan was terminated early, on 5 April 2021. On 15 May 2021 it was announced that he would leave Stevenage at the end of the season, following the expiry of his contract.

On 26 May 2021, Effiong agreed a deal to return to Woking on a one-year deal. On 21 August 2021, Effiong made his return in a Woking shirt, playing the full 90 minutes and assisting goalscorer, Max Kretzschmar during their 2–1 away victory against Wealdstone. He scored his first goal upon his return to the club during their 3–1 home victory over Chesterfield, netting the Cards' third in the 89th minute, completing the comeback after Saidou Khan's opener. Just four days later, Effiong scored once again, this time netting Woking's equaliser in their 4–1 away victory over former side, Notts County. Following one campaign back at Kingfield, on 26 May 2022, he announced that he would be leaving the club at the end of his contract in June. During his two spells, Effiong collated a total of 77 appearances and 23 goals to his name.

On 17 June 2022, Effiong agreed to join Woking's rivals Aldershot Town on a two-year deal. An impressive run of form saw Dagenham & Redbridge purchase the striker on an eighteen-month deal for an undisclosed fee in February 2023. He was later awarded the National League Player of the Month award for January 2023 following seven goals in eight matches prior to his departure.

Career statistics

References

External links

1991 births
Living people
Footballers from the London Borough of Brent
English footballers
English people of Nigerian descent
Association football forwards
St Albans City F.C. players
Northwood F.C. players
Boreham Wood F.C. players
Hitchin Town F.C. players
Chesham United F.C. players
Hayes & Yeading United F.C. players
Dunstable Town F.C. players
Burnham F.C. players
Arlesey Town F.C. players
Biggleswade Town F.C. players
Hertford Town F.C. players
Barrow A.F.C. players
Woking F.C. players
Ross County F.C. players
Dover Athletic F.C. players
Stevenage F.C. players
Barnet F.C. players
Notts County F.C. players
Aldershot Town F.C. players
Dagenham & Redbridge F.C. players
Isthmian League players
Southern Football League players
National League (English football) players
Scottish Professional Football League players
Black British sportspeople